Kerr Waddell (born 14 June 1998) is a Scottish professional footballer who plays as a defender for Montrose. He previously played for Dundee and on loan for Clyde and Greenock Morton.

Club career
Waddell is a product of Dundee's youth academy. Having featured regularly for Dundee's U20 side, including playing in a Challenge Cup tie against Cove Rangers, Waddell was named among the substitutes for a handful of senior league games during the 2016–17 season, without making an appearance.

On 30 March 2017, Waddell, along with Dundee teammate Kyle Gourlay, signed on loan for Scottish League Two club Clyde until the end of the season.

Waddell made his competitive debut for Dundee on 18 July 2017, against Raith Rovers in the Scottish League Cup, replacing Darren O'Dea after 82 minutes. He went on to start Dundee's next three League Cup group stage matches, as the club progressed to the knockout rounds as runners-up to rivals Dundee United. Waddell scored his first goals in his senior career in a 2–1 win against Hearts.

Waddell moved on loan to Scottish Championship club Greenock Morton in July 2018. On 14 November his loan spell was extended until the end of the season. Waddell scored his first goal for the club with the opener as Morton defeated Peterhead in the Scottish Cup.

On 30 June 2019, Waddell left Dundee following the expiry of his contract.

In July 2019 Waddell signed a two-year contract with Scottish League One side Montrose.

Career statistics

References

External links

1998 births
Association football defenders
Clyde F.C. players
Dundee F.C. players
Greenock Morton F.C. players
Living people
Scottish footballers
Scottish Professional Football League players
Footballers from Dundee
Montrose F.C. players